Everything's Trash is an American comedy television series that premiered on July 13, 2022 on Freeform. It was created by Phoebe Robinson. In November 2022, the series was canceled after one season.

Plot

The show centers itself around a podcast host navigating life, and sex in Brooklyn.  

It picks up when Phoebe's brother, Jayden decides to run for office in New York City. Phoebe, unwittingly, sleeps with the campaign manager for her brother's opponent. News swiftly breaks that Phoebe and Hamilton have slept together when Phoebe is seen leaving Hamilton's apartment the next morning. This causes a rift between Phoebe and Jayden. Phoebe swears that it was a just a one time thing but is upset with Jayden because she feels like he is slut shaming her for her carefree approach to sexual hookups. The siblings make up as the show continues to center on Jayden's political run for office, Phoebe's attempts to cease attraction for Hamilton, and her work-life balance with her podcast role at the company Parakeet.

Cast and characters

Main

 Phoebe Robinson as Phoebe
 Jordan Carlos as Jayden
 Toccarra Cash as Malika
 Nneka Okafor as Jessie
 Moses Storm as Michael

Recurring
 Brandon Jay McLaren as Hamilton
 June Diane Raphael as Jax

Episodes

Production

Development
On February 25, 2021, Freeform gave Everything's Trash But It's Okay a pilot order with Phoebe Robinson as the star and writer. On May 4, 2021, the title was changed to Everything's Trash. On September 30, 2021, Everything's Trash had been given a series order. The series premiered on July 13, 2022. On November 11, 2022, Freeform canceled the series after one season.

Casting
Upon the title change announcement, Jordan Carlos, Toccarra Cash, Nneka Okafor and Moses Storm were cast to star. On May 13, 2021, Jackée Harry and George Wallace were cast in recurring roles.

Reception

Critical response

Ratings

References

External links

2020s American comedy television series
2022 American television series debuts
2022 American television series endings
English-language television shows
Freeform (TV channel) original programming
Television series by ABC Studios
Television series about siblings
Television shows based on books
Television shows set in Brooklyn